Jörg Leichtfried (born 18 June 1967 in Bruck an der Mur, Styria) is an Austrian politician of the Social Democratic Party who has been serving as a member of the National Council since the 2017 elections. He previously served as Minister of Transport, Innovation and Technology in the government of Chancellor Christian Kern from 2016 until 2017.

Education
 Studied jurisprudence (graduated 1994)

Career
 1995-1999: Legal officer, Styrian Chamber of Labour
 1998-2004: Departmental head, citizens' advice service, Bruck and der Mur's City council

Political career

Early beginnings
 1994-2000: Regional vice-chairman of the Styria Young Socialists
 1999: Austrian Parliament candidate, Styria Young Socialists
 2000-2002: Federal chairman of the Austrian Young Socialists
 since 2000: Regional Party vice-chairman of the Styria SPÖ

Member of the European Parliament, 2004–2015
Leichtfried was first elected a Member of the European Parliament (MEP) with the SPÖ, part of the Socialist Group, in the 2004 European elections. During his time in parliament, he served on the European Parliament's Committee on Transport and Tourism. In this capacity, he was the Parliament's rapporteur on the European Aviation Safety Agency (2007) and on the cross-border admission of heavy haulers (2014), among other dossiers.

In addition, Leichtfried was a substitute for the Committee on International Trade, a member of the Delegation for relations with the countries of the Andean Community and a substitute for the Delegation for relations with the countries of Central America. He was also a member of the European Parliament Intergroup on the Welfare and Conservation of Animals and of the European Parliament Intergroup on the Digital Agenda.

Federal Minister of Transport, 2016–2017
In May 2016, incoming Chancellor Christian Kern appointed Leichtfried as Federal Minister for Transport, Innovation and Technology.

Under his leadership, Austria announced plans in March 2017 to file a legal challenge at the European Court of Justice against plans by Germany to introduce a road toll for foreign-registered cars using German highways.

References

External links
 
 

1967 births
Living people
Social Democratic Party of Austria MEPs
MEPs for Austria 2004–2009
MEPs for Austria 2009–2014
MEPs for Austria 2014–2019
Articles containing video clips
Government ministers of Austria